The year was highlighted by protests and other unrests that occurred worldwide.

Events

January–February 

 January – The I'm Backing Britain campaign started spontaneously.
 January 5 – "Prague Spring": Alexander Dubček is chosen as leader of the Communist Party of Czechoslovakia.
 January 10 – John Gorton is sworn in as 19th Prime Minister of Australia, taking over from John McEwen after being elected leader of the Liberal Party the previous day, following the disappearance of Harold Holt. Gorton becomes the only Senator to become Prime Minister, though he immediately transfers to the House of Representatives through the 1968 Higgins by-election in Holt's vacant seat.
 January 15 – The 1968 Belice earthquake in Sicily kills 380 and injures around 1,000.
 January 21
 Vietnam War: Battle of Khe Sanh – One of the most publicized and controversial battles of the war begins, ending on April 8.
 1968 Thule Air Base B-52 crash: A U.S. B-52 Stratofortress crashes in Greenland, discharging 4 nuclear bombs.
 January 25 – Israeli submarine  sinks in the Mediterranean Sea, killing 69.

 January 28 – French submarine Minerve sinks in the Mediterranean Sea, killing 52.
 January 30 – Vietnam War: The Tet Offensive begins as Viet Cong forces launch a series of surprise attacks across South Vietnam.
 January 31
 Viet Cong soldiers attack the Embassy of the United States, Saigon.
 Nauru president Hammer DeRoburt declares independence from Australia.
 February 1
 Vietnam War: A Viet Cong officer named Nguyễn Văn Lém is executed by Nguyễn Ngọc Loan, a South Vietnamese National Police Chief. The event is photographed by Eddie Adams. The photo makes headlines around the world, eventually winning the 1969 Pulitzer Prize, and sways U.S. public opinion against the war.
 The Pennsylvania Railroad and the New York Central Railroad merge to form Penn Central, the largest ever corporate merger up to this date.
 February 6–February 18 – The 1968 Winter Olympics are held in Grenoble, France.
 February 12 – Vietnam War: Phong Nhị and Phong Nhất massacre.
 February 24 – Vietnam War: The Tet Offensive is halted; South Vietnam recaptures Huế.
 February 25 – Vietnam War: Hà My massacre.

March–April 

 March 2 – Baggeridge Colliery closes marking the end of over 300 years of coal mining in the Black Country of England.
 March 6 – Un-recognized Rhodesia executes 3 black citizens, the first executions since UDI, prompting international condemnation.
 March 7 – Vietnam War: The First Battle of Saigon ends.
 March 8
 The first student protests spark the 1968 Polish political crisis.
 The Soviet ballistic missile submarine K-129 sinks with all 98 crew members, about 90 nautical miles (104 miles or 167 km) southwest of Hawaii.
 March 10–11 – Vietnam War: Battle of Lima Site 85, the largest single ground combat loss of United States Air Force members (12) during the (at this time) secret war later known as the Laotian Civil War.
 March 11 – U.S. President Lyndon B. Johnson mandates that all computers purchased by the federal government support the ASCII character encoding.
 March 12
 Mauritius achieves independence from British rule.
 U.S. President Lyndon B. Johnson barely edges out antiwar candidate Eugene McCarthy in the New Hampshire Democratic primary, a vote which highlights the deep divisions in the country, and the party, over Vietnam.
 March 13 – The first Rotaract club is chartered in North Charlotte, North Carolina.
 March 14 – Nerve gas leaks from the U.S. Army Dugway Proving Ground near Skull Valley, Utah.
 March 16
 Vietnam War – My Lai Massacre: American troops kill scores of civilians. The story will first become public in November 1969 and will help undermine public support for the U.S. efforts in Vietnam.
 U.S. Senator Robert F. Kennedy enters the race for the Democratic Party presidential nomination.
 March 18 – Gold standard: The United States Congress repeals the requirement for a gold reserve to back U.S. currency.
 March 19–23 – Afrocentrism, Black Power, Vietnam War: Students at Howard University in Washington, D.C., signal a new era of militant student activism on college campuses in the U.S. Students stage rallies, protests and a 5-day sit-in, laying siege to the administration building, shutting down the university in protest over its ROTC program and the Vietnam War, and demanding a more Afrocentric curriculum.
 March 22 – Daniel Cohn-Bendit ("Danny the Red") and 7 other students occupy the administrative offices of the University of Nanterre, setting in motion a chain of events that lead France to the brink of revolution in May.
 March 24 – Aer Lingus Flight 712 crashes en route from Cork to London near Tuskar Rock, Wexford, killing 61 passengers and crew.
 March 28 – Brazilian high school student Edson Luís de Lima Souto is shot by the police in a protest for cheaper meals at a restaurant for low-income students. The aftermath of his death is one of the first major events against the military dictatorship.
 April 2 – Bombs explode at midnight in two department stores in Frankfurt-am-Main; Andreas Baader and Gudrun Ensslin are later arrested and sentenced for arson.
 April 4
 Assassination of Martin Luther King Jr.: Martin Luther King Jr. is shot dead at the Lorraine Motel in Memphis, Tennessee. King-assassination riots erupt in major American cities, lasting for several days afterwards.
 Apollo program: Apollo-Saturn mission 502 (Apollo 6) is launched, as the second and last uncrewed test-flight of the Saturn V launch vehicle.
 AEK Athens wins the FIBA European Cup Winners Cup Final in basketball against Slavia Prague, in front of a record attendance of 80,000 spectators. It is the first major European trophy won at club level of any sport in Greece.
 April 6
 "La, la, la" by Massiel (music and lyrics by Manuel de la Calva and Ramón Arcusa) wins the Eurovision Song Contest 1968 for Spain, at the Royal Albert Hall in London.
 A shootout between Black Panthers and police in Oakland, California, results in several arrests and deaths, including 17-year-old Panther Bobby Hutton.
 Richmond, Indiana explosion: A double explosion in downtown Richmond kills 41 and injures 150.
 April 7 – British racing driver Jim Clark is killed in a Formula 2 race at Hockenheim.
 April 10 – The ferry  strikes a reef at the mouth of Wellington Harbour, New Zealand, with the loss of 53 lives, in Cyclone Giselle, which has created the windiest conditions ever recorded in New Zealand.
 April 11
 Josef Bachmann tries to assassinate Rudi Dutschke, leader of the left-wing movement (APO) in Germany, and tries to commit suicide afterwards, failing in both, although Dutschke dies of his brain injuries 11 years later.
 German left-wing students blockade the Springer Press HQ in Berlin and many are arrested (one of them Ulrike Meinhof).
 April 20 – Pierre Elliott Trudeau becomes the 15th Prime Minister of Canada.
 April 23
 President Mobutu releases captured mercenaries in the Congo.
 Surgeons at the Hôpital de la Pitié, Paris, perform Europe's first heart transplant, on Clovis Roblain.
 The United Methodist Church is created by the union in Dallas, Texas, of the former Methodist and Evangelical United Brethren churches.
 April 23–30 – Vietnam War: Columbia University protests of 1968 – Student protesters at Columbia University in New York City take over administration buildings and shut down the university.
 April 26 – The nuclear weapon "Boxcar" is tested at the Nevada Test Site in the biggest detonation of Operation Crosstie.

May–June 

 May 2 – The Israel Broadcasting Authority commences television broadcasts.
 May 3 – Braniff Flight 352 crashes near Dawson, Texas, United States, killing all 85 people on board.
 May 13 – Paris student riots: One million march through the streets of Paris.
 May 13 – Manchester City wins the 1967–68 Football League First Division by 2 clear points, over club rivals Manchester United
 May 16 – Ronan Point, a 23 floor tower block in Canning Town, east London, partially collapses after a gas explosion, killing 5.
 May 17 – The Catonsville Nine enter the Selective Service offices in Catonsville, Maryland, take dozens of selective service draft records, and burn them with napalm as a protest against the Vietnam War.
 May 18
 Mattel's Hot Wheels toy cars are introduced.
 West Bromwich Albion win the Football Association Cup, defeating Everton 1–0 after extra time. The winning goal is scored by Jeff Astle.
 May 19
 A general election is held in Italy.
 Nigerian forces capture Port Harcourt and form a ring around the Biafrans. This contributes to a humanitarian disaster as the surrounded population already suffers from hunger and starvation.
 May 22 – The U.S. nuclear-powered submarine Scorpion sinks with 99 men aboard, 400 miles southwest of the Azores.
 May 29 – Manchester United wins the European Cup Final, becoming the first English team to do so.
 May 30 – Bobby Unser wins the Indianapolis 500.
 June 2 – Student demonstrations in Yugoslavia start in Belgrade.
 June 3 – Radical feminist Valerie Solanas shoots Andy Warhol at his New York City studio, The Factory; he survives after a 5-hour operation.
 June 4 – The Standard & Poor's 500 index in the United States closes above 100 for the first time, at 100.38.
 June 5 – Assassination of Robert F. Kennedy: U.S. presidential candidate Robert F. Kennedy is shot at the Ambassador Hotel in Los Angeles. Sirhan Sirhan is arrested.
 June 7 – The Ford sewing machinists strike for equal pay starts at the Ford Dagenham plant in London.
 June 10 – Italy beats Yugoslavia 2–0 in a replay to win the 1968 European Championship. The original final on June 8 ended 1–1.
 June 12 – The horror film Rosemary's Baby premieres in the U.S.
 June 17 – The Malayan Communist Party launches a second insurgency and the state of emergency is again imposed in Malaysia.
 June 20 – Austin Currie, Member of the Parliament of Northern Ireland, along with others, squats in a house in Caledon to protest discrimination in housing allocations.
 June 21 – : A student demonstration in front of the Jornal do Brasil ("JB") building ends with 28 dead and over a thousand arrested.
 June 23
 Puerta 12 tragedy: A football stampede in Buenos Aires leaves 74 dead and 150 injured.
 The first round of voting takes place in the French legislative elections scheduled following the public unrest of May.
 June 26
 The Bonin Islands are returned to Japan after 23 years of occupation by the United States Navy.
 The "March of the One Hundred Thousand" takes place in Rio de Janeiro as crowds demonstrate against the Brazilian military government.

July–August 

 July 1 – The Nuclear Non-Proliferation Treaty opens for signature.
 July 4 – British yachtsman Alec Rose, 59, receives a hero's welcome as he sails into Portsmouth, after his 354-day round-the-world trip.
 July 17 – Saddam Hussein becomes Vice Chairman of the Revolutionary Council in Iraq after a coup d'état.
 July 18 – The semiconductor company Intel is founded.
 July 20 – The first International Special Olympics Summer Games are held at Soldier Field in Chicago, Ill, with about 1,000 athletes with intellectual disabilities.
 July 23–28 – Black militants led by Fred (Ahmed) Evans engage in a fierce gunfight with police in the Glenville Shootout of Cleveland, Ohio, in the United States.
 July 25 – Pope Paul VI publishes the encyclical entitled Humanae vitae, on birth control.
 July 26 – Vietnam War: South Vietnamese opposition leader Trương Đình Dzu is sentenced to 5 years hard labor, for advocating the formation of a coalition government as a way to move toward an end to the war.
 July 29 – Arenal Volcano erupts in Costa Rica for the first time in centuries.
August 1 – The Municipal University of São Caetano do Sul is established in São Caetano do Sul, São Paulo.
August 2 – The magnitude 7.6 Casiguran earthquake affects the Aurora province in the Philippines with a maximum Mercalli intensity of IX (Violent), killing at least 207 and injuring 261.
 August 5–8 – The Republican National Convention in Miami Beach, Florida nominates Richard Nixon for U.S. president and Spiro Agnew for vice president.
 August 11 – The last steam passenger train service runs in Britain. A selection of British Railways steam locomotives make the 120-mile journey from Liverpool to Carlisle and return to Liverpool – the journey is known as the Fifteen Guinea Special.
 August 18 – Two charter buses are forced into the Hida River on National Highway Route 41 in Japan in an accident caused by heavy rain; 104 are killed.
 August 20–21 – Warsaw Pact invasion of Czechoslovakia: The 'Prague Spring' of political liberalization ends, as 750,000 Warsaw Pact troops and 6,500 tanks with 800 aircraft invade Czechoslovakia, the largest military operation in Europe since the end of World War II.
 August 24 – Canopus (nuclear test): France explodes its first hydrogen bomb in a test at Fangataufa atoll in French Polynesia.
 August 22–30 – Police clash with anti-war protesters in Chicago outside the 1968 Democratic National Convention, which nominates Hubert Humphrey for U.S. president and Edmund Muskie for vice president. The riots and subsequent trials are an essential part of the activism of the Youth International Party.
 August 29 – Crown Prince Harald of Norway marries Sonja Haraldsen, the commoner he has dated for 9 years.

September–October 

 September 6 – Swaziland (now eSwatini) becomes independent.
 September 7 
The crash of Air France Flight 1611 kills 95 people, including French Army General René Cogny, as the Caravelle jetliner plunges into the Mediterranean Sea while making its approach to Nice following its departure from the island of Corsica.
 The International Association of Classification Societies (IACS) is founded.
 September 13
 Albania officially withdraws from the Warsaw Pact upon the Soviet Union-led Warsaw Pact invasion of Czechoslovakia, having already ceased to participate actively in Pact activity since 1962.
 September 17 – The D'Oliveira affair: The Marylebone Cricket Club tour of South Africa is cancelled when the South Africans refuse to accept the presence of Basil D'Oliveira, a Cape Coloured, in the side.
 September 21 – The Soviet's Zond 5 uncrewed lunar flyby mission returns to earth, with its first-of-a-kind biological payload intact.
 September 23 – Vietnam War: The Tet Offensive comes to an end in South Vietnam.
 September 27 – Marcelo Caetano becomes prime minister of Portugal.
 September 29 – A referendum in Greece gives more power to the military junta.
 October 2 – Tlatelolco massacre: A student demonstration ends in bloodbath at La Plaza de las Tres Culturas in Tlatelolco, Mexico City, Mexico, 10 days before the inauguration of the 1968 Summer Olympics. 300-400 are estimated to have been killed.
 October 3 – In Peru, Juan Velasco Alvarado takes power in a revolution.
 October 8 – Vietnam War – Operation Sealords: United States and South Vietnamese forces launch a new operation in the Mekong Delta.
 October 11
 Apollo program: NASA launches Apollo 7, the first crewed Apollo mission (Wally Schirra, Donn Eisele, Walter Cunningham). Mission goals include the first live television broadcast from orbit and simulating lunar module rendezvous and docking, using the S-IVB rocket stage as a test target.
 In Panama, a military coup d'état, led by Col. Boris Martinez and Col. Omar Torrijos, overthrows the democratically elected (but highly controversial) government of President Arnulfo Arias. Within a year, Torrijos ousts Martinez and takes charge as de facto Head of Government in Panama.
 October 12–27 – The Games of the XIX Olympiad are held in Mexico City, Mexico.
 October 12 – Equatorial Guinea receives its independence from Spain.
 October 14
 Vietnam War: The United States Department of Defense announces that the United States Army and United States Marines will send about 24,000 troops back to Vietnam for involuntary second tours.
 October 16
 In Mexico City, African-American athletes Tommie Smith and John Carlos raise their fists in a black power salute after winning, respectively, the gold and bronze medals in the Olympic men's 200 metres.
 Kingston, Jamaica is rocked by the Rodney Riots, provoked by the banning of Walter Rodney from the country.
 October 18 – US athlete Bob Beamon breaks the long jump world record by 55 cm / 21 ins at the Olympics in Mexico City. His record stands for 23 years, and is still the second longest jump in history.
 October 25 – Led Zeppelin make their first live performance, at Surrey University in England
 October 31 – Vietnam War: Citing progress in the Paris peace talks, U.S. President Lyndon B. Johnson announces to the nation that he has ordered a complete cessation of "all air, naval, and artillery bombardment of North Vietnam" effective November 1.

November–December 

 November 5
 1968 United States presidential election: Republican candidate Richard Nixon defeats the Democratic candidate, Vice President Hubert Humphrey, and American Independent Party candidate George Wallace.
 Luis A. Ferré, of the newly formed New Progressive Party is elected Governor of Puerto Rico, by beating incumbent governor Roberto Sánchez Vilella of the People's Party, Luis Negrón López of the Popular Democratic Party and Antonio J. Gonzalez of the Puerto Rican Independence Party, he also becomes the first "statehooder" governor of the Island.
 November 11 – A second republic is declared in the Maldives.
 November 15 – Vietnam War: Operation Commando Hunt is initiated to interdict men and supplies on the Ho Chi Minh trail, through Laos into South Vietnam. By the end of the operation, 3 million tons of bombs are dropped on Laos, slowing but not seriously disrupting trail operations.
 November 17
 British European Airways introduces the BAC One-Eleven into commercial service.
 The Heidi Game: NBC cuts off the final 1:05 of an Oakland Raiders–New York Jets football game to broadcast the pre-scheduled Heidi. Fans are unable to see Oakland (which had been trailing 32–29) score 2 late touchdowns to win 43–32; as a result, thousands of outraged football fans flood the NBC switchboards to protest.
 November 19 – In Mali, President Modibo Keïta's regime is overthrown in a bloodless military coup led by Moussa Traoré.
 November 20 – The Farmington Mine disaster in Farmington, West Virginia, kills seventy-eight men.
 November 24 – 4 men hijack Pan Am Flight 281 from JFK International Airport, New York to Havana, Cuba.
 December 9 – Douglas Engelbart publicly demonstrates his pioneering hypertext system, NLS, in San Francisco, together with the computer mouse, at what becomes retrospectively known as "The Mother of All Demos".
 December 10 – Japan's biggest heist, the never-solved "300 million yen robbery", occurs in Tokyo.
 December 11
 The film Oliver! based on the hit London and Broadway musical, opens in the U.S. after being released first in the UK. It goes on to win the Academy Award for Best Picture.

 December 13 – Prompted by growing unrest and a perceived proliferation of "pro-communist" violent actions, Brazilian president Artur da Costa e Silva enacts the so-called AI-5, the fifth of a series of non-constitutional emergency decrees allegedly to help "stabilize" the country after the turmoils of the early 1960s.
 December 22 – Mao Zedong advocates that educated urban youth in China be sent for re-education in the countryside. It marks the start of the "Up to the mountains and down to the villages" movement.
 December 24 – Apollo program: The crewed U.S. spacecraft Apollo 8 enters orbit around the Moon. Astronauts Frank Borman, Jim Lovell and William Anders become the first humans to see the far side of the Moon and planet Earth as a whole, as well as having traveled further away from Earth than any people in history. Anders photographs Earthrise. The crew also give a reading from the Book of Genesis.
 December 28 – Israeli forces fly into Lebanese airspace, launching an attack on the airport in Beirut and destroying more than a dozen aircraft.

Dates unknown 
 The Khmer Rouge is officially formed in Cambodia as an offshoot movement of the Vietnam People's Army from North Vietnam to bring communism to the nation. A few years later, they will become bitter enemies.
 La Maestra, a Latin American play is written by Enrique Buenaventura.
 An oil field is confirmed in Northern Alaska: the Prudhoe Bay Oil Field.
 Midea Group, a well-known home appliance worldwide, founded in Guangdong Province, China.

Births

January 

 January 1 – Davor Šuker, Croatian footballer
 January 2
 Oleg Deripaska, Russian businessman 
 Cuba Gooding Jr., American actor
 Anky van Grunsven, Dutch equesterian
 January 3 – Matheus Nachtergaele, Brazilian actor and director
 January 5
 DJ BoBo, Swiss singer, songwriter and dancer
 Andrzej Gołota, Polish boxer
 Carrie Ann Inaba, American choreographer, game show host and singer
 Leila Meskhi, Georgian tennis player
 January 6
 Blanca Eekhout, Venezuelan politician
 John Singleton, African-American film director and writer (d. 2019)
 January 8 – James Brokenshire, British politician (d. 2021)
 January 11 – Benjamin List, German organic chemist, recipient of Nobel Prize in Chemistry
 January 12 
Rachael Harris, American actress and comedian
Lisa Marie Presley, American singer, songwriter and daughter of Elvis Presley (d. 2023)
 January 13 – Pat Onstad, Canadian footballer
 January 14 – LL Cool J, African-American rapper and actor
 January 15 – Chad Lowe, American actor and director
 January 16
 Stephan Pastis, American cartoonist
 Atticus Ross, English musician, songwriter, record producer and audio engineer
 January 17 – Svetlana Masterkova, Russian athlete
 January 21 – Charlotte Ross, American actress
 January 22 – Guy Fieri, American chef
 January 24
 Michael Kiske, German musician
 Mary Lou Retton, American gymnast
 January 26
 Eric Davis, American football player
 Novala Takemoto, Japanese author and fashion designer
 January 27 – Mike Patton, American singer
 January 28 – Sarah McLachlan, Canadian singer
 January 29 – Edward Burns, American actor
 January 30 – King Felipe VI of Spain

February 

 February 1
 Mark Recchi, Canadian ice hockey player
 Pauly Shore, American actor
 February 3
 David Scarboro, English actor (d. 1988)
 Vlade Divac, Serbian basketball player
 Marwan Khoury, Lebanese singer and composer
 February 5
 Roberto Alomar, American baseball player
 Marcus Grönholm, Finnish rally driver
 Qasim Melho, Syrian television actor
 February 7
 Peter Bondra, Slovakian ice hockey player
 Porntip Nakhirunkanok, Miss Universe 1988
 February 8
 Gary Coleman, African-American actor (d. 2010)
 April Stewart, American voice actress
 February 10
 Laurie Foell, New Zealand/Australian actress
 Atika Suri, Indonesian television newscaster
 February 11
 Lavinia Agache, Romanian artistic gymnast
 Mo Willems, American children's book author
 February 12 – Josh Brolin, American actor
 February 13
 Kelly Hu, American actress, voice artist, former fashion model and beauty queen
 Niamh Kavanagh, Irish singer, Eurovision Song Contest 1993 winner
 February 14 – Jules Asner, American model and television personality
 February 15 – Gloria Trevi, Mexican singer and actress
 February 18
 Molly Ringwald, American actress
 Dennis Satin, German film director
 February 21 – Pellom McDaniels, American football player (d. 2020)
 February 22
 Bradley Nowell, American musician (d. 1996)
 Jeri Ryan, American actress
 February 24
 Andy Berman, American actor, director, producer, writer, voice artist, and comedian
 Mitch Hedberg, American stand-up comedian (d. 2005)
 February 29 – Sam Sneed, American producer and rapper

March 

 March 1
 Kat Cressida, American voice actress
 Kunjarani Devi, Indian weightlifter
 Muho Noelke, German Zen master
 March 2 – Daniel Craig, British actor
 March 3 – Brian Leetch, American ice hockey player
 March 4
 Giovanni Carrara, Venezuelan Major League Baseball player
 Patsy Kensit, British actress
 March 5
 Gordon Bajnai, Hungarian Prime Minister
 Ambrose Mandvulo Dlamini, 10th Prime Minister of Eswatini  (d. 2020)
 March 6 – Moira Kelly, American actress
 March 7 – Jeff Kent, American baseball player
 March 9 
 Youri Djorkaeff, French footballer
 Rexy Mainaky, Indonesian badminton player
 March 11 – Lisa Loeb, American singer
 March 12 – Aaron Eckhart, American actor
 March 13 
 Gillian Keegan, British politician
 Masami Okui, Japanese singer
 March 14
 Megan Follows, Canadian-American actress
 James Frain, British actor
 March 15
 Mark McGrath, American singer
 Terje Riis-Johansen, Norwegian politician
 Sabrina Salerno, Italian singer
 March 16
 David MacMillan, Scottish-born organic chemist, recipient of Nobel Prize in Chemistry
 Trevor Wilson, American basketball player
 March 20
 Carlos Almeida, Cape Verdean long-distance runner
 Ultra Naté, American singer, songwriter, record producer, DJ and promoter
 March 22 – Euronymous, Norwegian musician (d. 1993)
 March 23
 Damon Albarn, English singer-songwriter and musician
 Mike Atherton, English cricketer
 Fernando Hierro, Spanish football player and coach
 March 26
 Kenny Chesney, American country music singer
 James Iha, American rock musician
 March 27 – Ben Koldyke, American actor
 March 28 – Iris Chang, American author (d. 2004)
 March 29 – Lucy Lawless, New Zealand actress and singer
 March 30 – Celine Dion, Canadian singer
 March 31 – César Sampaio, Brazilian football player and coach

April 

 April 1
 Julia Boutros, Lebanese singer
 Andreas Schnaas, German director
 April 5
 Paula Cole, American singer
 Stewart Lee, English stand-up comedian
April 7 – Jože Možina, Slovenian historian, sociologist and journalist
 April 8 
 Patricia Arquette, American actress
 Shawn Fonteno, American actor
 April 12 – Ott, English musician and record producer
 April 13 – Jørn Stubberud, Norwegian musician
 April 14 – Anthony Michael Hall, American actor and singer
 April 15 – Stacey Williams, American model
 April 16
 Greg Baker, American actor and musician
 Martin Dahlin, Swedish football player
 Vickie Guerrero, American professional wrestler
 April 17
 Julie Fagerholt, Danish fashion designer
 Adam McKay, American film director, producer, screenwriter, comedian, and actor
 April 18 – David Hewlett, English-born Canadian actor, writer and director
 April 19 – Ashley Judd, American actress
 April 20
 J. D. Roth, American television host
 Yelena Välbe, Russian cross-country skier
 April 23 – Timothy McVeigh, American terrorist (d. 2001)
 April 24
 Stacy Haiduk, American actress
 Jorge Medina, Bolivian civil rights activist and politician (d. 2022)
 Yuji Nagata, Japanese professional wrestler
 April 28 – Howard Donald, British singer (Take That)
 April 29
 Kolinda Grabar-Kitarović, President of Croatia (2015-2020)
 Michael Herbig, German film director, actor and author
 Darren Matthews, English professional wrestler

May 

 May 1 – Oliver Bierhoff, German footballer
 May 2
 Jeff Agoos, American soccer player
 Hikaru Midorikawa, Japanese voice actor
 May 3
 Nina Paley, American cartoonist
 Li Yong (television host), Chinese host (d. 2018)
 May 4
 Julian Barratt, English comedian, actor, musician and music producer
 Momoko Kikuchi, Japanese actress and singer
 May 5 – John Soko, Zambian footballer (d. 1993)
 May 7
 Eagle-Eye Cherry, Swedish-born musician
 Traci Lords, American actress
 May 8 – Mickaël Madar, French footballer
 May 9 
 Carla Overbeck, American soccer player
 Marie-José Pérec, French athlete
 Nataša Pirc Musar, Slovenian politician, attorney, author, journalist and 5th President of Slovenia
 May 10 – Al Murray, English comedian
 May 12  – Tony Hawk, American skateboarder
 May 13
 Sonja Zietlow, German television presenter
 Scott Morrison, 30th Prime Minister of Australia
 May 16 – Chingmy Yau, Hong Kong actress
 May 17 – Constance Menard, French professional dressage rider
 May 18 – Vanessa Leggett, American freelance journalist, author, lecturer and First Amendment advocate
 May 19 – Kyle Eastwood, American jazz bass musician
 May 20
 Timothy Olyphant, American actor
 Waisale Serevi, Fijian rugby player
 May 22
 Michael Kelly, American actor
 Graham Linehan, Irish television writer and director
 May 23 – John Ortiz, American actor
 May 24 – Charles De'Ath, English actor
 May 26 – Crown Prince Frederik of Denmark
 May 27
 Jeff Bagwell, American baseball player
 Frank Thomas, American baseball player
 May 28 – Kylie Minogue, Australian actress and singer
 May 30 – Zacarias Moussaoui, French-Moroccan 9/11 conspirator

June 

 June 1 – Jason Donovan, Australian actor and singer
 June 2
 Beetlejuice, American entertainer, member of the Wack Pack (The Howard Stern Show)
 Jon Culshaw, English impressionist
 June 4 – Scott Wolf, American actor
 June 5 – Sandra Annenberg, Brazilian newscaster, previously actress
 June 9 – Aleksandr Konovalov, Russian lawyer and politician
 June 10
 Bill Burr, American comedian
 Nobutoshi Canna, Japanese voice actor
 June 14 – Yasmine Bleeth, American actress
 June 16 – Mariana Mazzucato, Italian born-American economist
 June 20 – Mateusz Morawiecki, Polish banker and politician, 17th Prime Minister of Poland
 June 24 – Boris Gelfand, Israeli chess grandmaster
 June 25 – Albert Fulivai, Tongan rugby league player
 June 26
 Paolo Maldini, Italian football player
 Jovenel Moïse, 42nd President of Haiti (d. 2021)
 Iwan Roberts, Welsh footballer
 June 27 – Isabel Saint Malo, Panamian politician
 June 28
 Chayanne, Puerto Rican-American singer
 Adam Woodyatt, English actor
 June 29 – Theoren Fleury, Canadian ice hockey player
 June 30 – Phil Anselmo, American heavy metal vocalist

July 

 July 5
 Ken Akamatsu, Japanese manga artist
 Michael Stuhlbarg, American actor
 Darin LaHood, American attorney and politician
 July 6 – Rashid Sidek, Malaysian badminton player and coach
 July 7
 Jorja Fox, American actress
 Allen Payne, American actor
 Jeff VanderMeer, American writer
 July 8
 Billy Crudup, American actor
 Akio Suyama, Japanese voice actor
 Josephine Teo, Singaporean politician
 Michael Weatherly, American actor
 July 9 – Eduardo Santamarina, Mexican actor
 July 10 – Hassiba Boulmerka, Algerian athlete
 July 11 – Conrad Vernon, American voice actor and director
 July 13
 Robert Gant, American actor
 Omi Minami, Japanese voice actress
 July 14 – Samantha Gori, Italian basketball player
 July 15
 Leticia Calderón, Mexican actress
 Eddie Griffin, American actor and comedian
 July 16
 Dhanraj Pillay, Indian field hockey player
 Barry Sanders, American football player
 Olga de Souza, Brazilian-Italian singer, model and dancer
 July 17
 Darren Day, British actor and TV presenter
 Beth Littleford, American actress and comedian
 July 18 – Grant Bowler, New Zealand-born Australian actor
 July 19 – Robert Flynn, American vocalist and guitarist (Machine Head)
 July 23
 Gary Payton, American basketball player
 Stephanie Seymour, American model and actress
 July 24
 Kristin Chenoweth, American actress and singer
 Laura Leighton, American actress
 Troy Kotsur, American actor
 July 25 – John Grant, American singer-songwriter
 July 27 – Julian McMahon, Australian actor
 July 30
 Robert Korzeniowski, Polish athlete
 Terry Crews, American actor, television host, artist, and former American football player

August 

 August 1 – Pavo Urban, Croatian photographer (d. 1991)
 August 3 – Rod Beck, American baseball player (d. 2007)
 August 4
 Lee Mack, English actor and stand-up comedian
 Olga Neuwirth, Austrian composer
 August 5 – Patricia Tarabini, Argentine tennis player
 Marine Le Pen, French politician
 Colin McRae, Scottish rally car driver (d. 2007)
 August 6 
 August 7 – Lynn Strait, American musician (d. 1998)
 August 8 – Kimberly Brooks, American actress and voice artist
 August 9
 Gillian Anderson, American actress
 Eric Bana, Australian actor
 James Roy, Australian author
 August 12
 Pablo Rey, Spanish painter
 Paul Tucker, English songwriter and record producer
 Kōji Yusa, Japanese voice actor
 August 14
 Catherine Bell, American actress
 Darren Clarke, Northern Irish professional golfer
 Jason Leonard, English rugby player
 August 15 – Debra Messing, American actress
 August 16 – Arvind Kejriwal, Indian politician
 August 17
 Ed McCaffrey, American football player
 Bruno van Pottelsberghe, Belgian economist
 August 20
 Klas Ingesson, Swedish footballer (d. 2014)
 Yuri Shiratori Japanese actress and singer
 Bai Yansong, Chinese host
 August 21 
 Dina Carroll, British singer
 Stretch, American rapper and record producer (d. 1995)
 August 24
 Shoichi Funaki, Japanese professional wrestler
 Hiroshi Kitadani, Japanese singer
 Tim Salmon, American baseball player
 Daniel Pollock, Australian actor (d. 1992)
 August 25 – Rachael Ray, American television chef and host
 August 27 – Luis Tascón, Venezuelan politician (d. 2010)
 August 28
 Billy Boyd, Scottish actor
 Tom Warburton, American animator
 August 31
 Valdon Dowiyogo, Nauruan politician and Australian football player
 Hideo Nomo, Japanese baseball player

September 

 September 1
 Mohamed Atta, 9/11 ringleader of the hijackers and pilot of American Airlines Flight 11 (d. 2001)
 Atsuko Yuya, Japanese voice actress
 September 3 – Raymond Coulthard, English actor
 September 4
 John DiMaggio, American voice actor and comedian
 Mike Piazza, American baseball player
 September 5 – Thomas Levet, French golfer
 September 7 – Marcel Desailly, French footballer
 September 9 – Julia Sawalha, English actress
 September 10
 Big Daddy Kane, American hip-hop artist
 Guy Ritchie, British film director
 September 11
 Kay Hanley, American musician
 Tetsuo Kurata, Japanese actor
 September 13 – Laura Cutina, Romanian artistic gymnast
 September 15 – Danny Nucci, American actor
 September 16 – Marc Anthony, American actor and singer
 September 17
 Anastacia, American singer-songwriter
 Tito Vilanova, Spanish football manager (d. 2014)
 September 18 – Toni Kukoč, Croatian basketball player
 September 20 – Van Jones, African-American author
 September 21
 Lisa Angell, French singer
 Kevin Buzzard, British mathematician
 Ricki Lake, American actress, producer, and television presenter
 September 22 – Mihai Răzvan Ungureanu, 62nd Prime Minister of Romania
 September 23 –  Michelle Thomas, American actress (d. 1998)
 September 25
 Prince Friso of Orange-Nassau, (d. 2013)
 John A. List, American economist
 Will Smith, African-American actor and rapper
 September 26
 James Caviezel, American actor
 Michelle Meldrum, American guitarist (d. 2008)
 Tricia O'Kelley, American actress
 Ben Shenkman, American television, film and stage actor
 September 27
 Mari Kiviniemi, 62nd Prime Minister of Finland
 Paul Rudish, American voice actor and animator
 September 28
 Mika Häkkinen, Finnish double Formula 1 world champion
 Naomi Watts, British actress and film producer
 September 29
 Patrick Burns, American paranormal investigator and television personality
 Luke Goss, English singer and actor
 Alex Skolnick, American jazz/heavy metal guitarist
 Samir Soni, Indian film and TV actor
 September 30 – Bennet Omalu, Nigerian pathologist

October 

 October 1
Kevin Griffin, American singer-songwriter, frontman of Better Than Ezra
 Mark Durden-Smith, British television presenter
 Jay Underwood, American actor
 October 2
 Lucy Cohu, English actress
 Victoria Derbyshire, English broadcast presenter
 Jana Novotná, Czech tennis player (d. 2017)
 October 3 – Nadia Calviño, Spanish politician
 October 7
 Luminița Anghel, Romanian dance/pop recording artist, songwriter, television personality and politician
 Thom Yorke, British singer-songwriter
 October 8
 Daniela Castelo, Argentine journalist (d. 2011)
 Emily Procter, American actress
 October 9
 Troy Davis, American high-profile death row inmate and human rights activist (d. 2011)
 Pete Docter, American animator, director
 October 10
 Bart Brentjens, Dutch mountainbiker
 Feridun Düzağaç, Turkish rock singer-songwriter
 October 11
 Tiffany Grant, American voice actress
 Jane Krakowski, American actress
 Brett Salisbury, American football quarterback
 October 12
 Paul Harragon, Australian rugby league player
 Hugh Jackman, Australian actor, singer, and producer
 October 13
 Preet Bharara, Indian-American politician
 Tisha Campbell-Martin, American actress and singer
 October 14
 Matthew Le Tissier, English footballer
 October 15
 Didier Deschamps, French footballer
 Jyrki 69, Finnish singer
 Nashwa Mustafa, Egyptian actress
 October 16 – Michael Stich, German tennis player
 October 20 – Damien Timmer, British joint-managing director, television producer, television executive producer
 October 22 – Shaggy, Jamaican singer
 October 24 – Mark Walton, American story artist, actor
 October 27 – Alain Auderset, Swedish writer
 October 28 – Juan Orlando Hernández, 55th President of Honduras
 October 29 
 Johann Olav Koss, Norwegian speed skater
 Tsunku, Japanese singer, music producer and song composer
 John Farley, American actor and comedian
 October 30
 Moira Quirk, English actress and voice actress
 Jack Plotnick, American film and television actor, writer, and producer

November 

 November 1 – Silvio Fauner, Italian cross-country skier
 November 4
 Lee Germon, New Zealand cricketer
 Daniel Landa, Czech composer, singer and actor
 Miles Long, American pornographic actor and director
 November 5
 Mr. Catra, Brazilian musician (d. 2018)
 Sam Rockwell, American actor
 Seth Gilliam, African-American actor
Penny Wong, Australian politician, Foreign Minister 
 November 6 – Kelly Rutherford, American actress
 November 7 – Ignacio Padilla, Mexican writer (d. 2016)
 November 8
 Parker Posey, American actress
 Zara Whites, Dutch actress
 November 9 – Nazzareno Carusi, Italian classical pianist
 November 10 – Tracy Morgan, African-American actor and comedian
 November 12
Kathleen Hanna, American musician and activist
 Aya Hisakawa, Japanese voice actress
 Sammy Sosa, Dominican Major League Baseball player
 November 13 – Pat Hentgen, American baseball player
 November 15
 Fausto Brizzi, Italian screenwriter and film director
 Ol' Dirty Bastard, American rapper (d. 2004)
 November 16 – Tammy Lauren, American actress
 November 18
 Barry Hunter, Northern Irish footballer and football manager
 Luizianne Lins, Brazilian politician
 Owen Wilson, American actor and comedian
 November 20
 Chew Chor Meng, Singaporean Chinese television actor
 John Trobaugh, American artist and photographer
 November 21 – Qiao Hong, Chinese table tennis player
 November 23 – Hamid Hassani, Iranian scholar
 November 24
 Phil Starbuck, former English footballer
 Awie, Malaysian rock singer
 yukihiro, Japanese musician
 November 25
 Tunde Baiyewu, British singer
 Jill Hennessy, Canadian actress
 November 27 – Michael Vartan, French actor
 November 29
 Hayabusa, Japanese professional wrestler (d. 2016)
 Jonathan Knight, American singer
 November 30 – Rica Matsumoto, Japanese actress, voice actress and singer

December 

 December 2
 Lucy Liu, American actress, voice actress, director, singer, dancer, model, and artist
 Rena Sofer, American actress
 December 3
 Brendan Fraser, Canadian-American actor
 Montell Jordan, American singer
 December 5 
 Margaret Cho, American actress and comedian
 Wendi Deng Murdoch, Chinese-American entrepreneur and businesswoman
 December 7 – Mark Geyer, Australian rugby league player
 December 9 – Kurt Angle, American amateur and professional wrestler, 1996 Olympic gold medalist
 December 11
 Emmanuelle Charpentier, French biochemist, recipient of Nobel Prize in Chemistry
 Monique Garbrecht-Enfeldt, German speed skater
 Eula Valdez, Filipino actress
 December 18 – Rachel Griffiths, Australian actress
 December 19 – Ken Marino, American actor and comedian
 December 20 – Nadia Farès, Moroccan born-French actress
 December 21 – Khrystyne Haje, American actress
 December 22 – Dina Meyer, American actress
 December 23 – Manuel Rivera-Ortiz, American photographer
 December 24 – Choi Jin-sil, South Korean actress and model (d. 2008)
 December 25 – Helena Christensen, Danish model
 December 28 – Lior Ashkenazi, Israeli actor
 December 30 – Fabrice Guy, French Olympic skier

Unknown date 
 Eleonora Requena, Venezuelan poet.
 Martin Ssempa, Ugandan pastor and internet meme.
 Isadora Zubillaga, Venezuelan diplomat and activist.

Deaths

January 

 January 4
 Armando Castellazzi, Italian footballer and manager (b. 1904)
 Joseph Pholien, Belgian politician, 37th Prime Minister of Belgium (b. 1884)
 January 6 – Karl Kobelt, 2-time President of the Swiss Confederation (b. 1891)
 January 7
 Gholamreza Takhti, Iranian wrestler (b. 1930)
 Mario Roatta, Italian general (b. 1887)
 January 9 – Kōkichi Tsuburaya, Japanese athlete (b. 1940)
 January 10
 Ali Fuat Cebesoy, Turkish politician (b. 1882)
 Eben Dönges, acting Prime Minister of South Africa and elected President of South Africa (b. 1898)
 January 15 – Leopold Infeld, Polish physicist (b. 1898)
 January 16 – Bob Jones Sr., American evangelist, religious broadcaster, and founder of Bob Jones University (b. 1883)
 January 18 – John Ridgely, American actor (b. 1909)
 January 21 – Georg Dertinger, German politician (b. 1902)
 January 22
 Aleksandr Arbuzov, Russian chemist (b. 1877)
 Duke Kahanamoku, American Olympic swimmer (b. 1890)
 January 29 – Tsuguharu Foujita, Japanese-French painter and printmaker (b. 1886)

February 

 February 4
 Eddie Baker, American actor (b. 1897)
 Neal Cassady, American author and poet (b. 1926)
 February 7 – Nick Adams, American actor (b. 1931)
 February 10 – Pitirim Sorokin, Russian-American sociologist (b. 1889)
 February 11 – Howard Lindsay, American playwright (b. 1888)
 February 13
 Mae Marsh, American actress (b. 1894)
 Ildebrando Pizzetti, Italian composer (b. 1880)
 February 15 – Little Walter, American blues musician, singer, and songwriter (b. 1930)
 February 17 – Sir Donald Wolfit, English actor (b. 1902)
 February 19 – Georg Hackenschmidt, German strongman and professional wrestler (b. 1877)
 February 20 – Anthony Asquith, British director and writer (b. 1902)
 February 21 – Howard Florey, Australian-born pharmacologist, recipient of the Nobel Prize for Physiology or Medicine (b. 1898)
 February 22 – Peter Arno, American cartoonist (b. 1904)
 February 25 – Camille Huysmans, Belgian politician, 34th Prime Minister of Belgium (b. 1871)
 February 27
 Frankie Lymon, American singer (b. 1942)
 Hertha Sponer, German physicist and chemist (b. 1895)
 February 29 – Hugo Benioff, American seismologist (b. 1899)

March 

 March 6 – Joseph W. Martin Jr., American politician (b. 1884)
 March 8 – Jerzy Braun, Polish athlete (b. 1911)
 March 14 – Erwin Panofsky, German-Jewish art historian (b. 1892)
 March 15 – Khuang Aphaiwong, 4th Prime Minister of Thailand, country leader during World War II (b. 1902)
 March 16 – Mario Castelnuovo-Tedesco, Italian composer (b. 1895)
 March 20 – Carl Theodor Dreyer, Danish film director (b. 1889)
 March 23 – Edwin O'Connor, American journalist, novelist, and radio commentator (b. 1918)
 March 24 – Alice Guy-Blaché, French filmmaker (b. 1873)
 March 27 – Yuri Gagarin, Soviet cosmonaut, first human in space (b. 1934)
 March 30 – Bobby Driscoll, American child actor (b. 1937)

April 

 April 1 – Lev Landau, Russian physicist, Nobel Prize laureate (b. 1908)
 April 4 –
 Martin Luther King Jr., American civil rights leader, recipient of the Nobel Peace Prize (b. 1929)
 Assis Chateaubriand, Brazilian newspaper magnate (b. 1892)
 April 7 – Jim Clark, Scottish racing driver and double Formula One World Champion (b. 1936)
 April 8 – Harold D. Babcock, American astronomer (b. 1882)
 April 15 – Boris Lyatoshinsky, Ukrainian composer, conductor, and teacher (b. 1895)
 April 16
 Fay Bainter, American actress (b. 1893)
 Albert Betz, German physicist (b. 1885)
 Edna Ferber, American writer (b. 1885)
 April 24
 Tommy Noonan, American actor (b. 1921)
 Walter Tewksbury, American athlete (b. 1876)
 April 25 – Gunnar Andersen, Norwegian footballer and ski jumper (b. 1890)
 April 26 – John Heartfield, German visual artist (b. 1891)

May 
 May 5 – Albert Dekker, American actor (b. 1905)
 May 7 – Lurleen Wallace, American politician (b. 1926)
 May 9
 Finlay Currie, Scottish actor (b. 1878)
 Marion Lorne, American actress (b. 1883)
 Mercedes de Acosta, American poet, playwright, and novelist (b. 1892)
 May 10 – Scotty Beckett, American child actor (b. 1929)
 May 11 – Robert Burks, American cinematographer (b. 1909)
 May 14 – Husband E. Kimmel, American admiral (b. 1882)
 May 25 – Georg von Küchler, German field marshal and war criminal (b. 1881)
 May 26 – Little Willie John, American R&B singer (b. 1937)
 May 28
 Kees van Dongen, Dutch-French painter (b. 1877)
 Fyodor Okhlopkov, Soviet sniper (b. 1908)

June 

 June 1 – Helen Keller, American activist and spokeswoman for the deaf and blind (b. 1880)
 June 2 – R. Norris Williams, American tennis player (b. 1891)
 June 4
 Dorothy Gish, American actress (b. 1898)
 Sir Walter Nash, 27th Prime Minister of New Zealand (b. 1882)
 June 6
 Randolph Churchill, British politician, son of Winston Churchill (b. 1911)
 Robert F. Kennedy, American lawyer and politician (United States Senator, U.S. Attorney General) (b. 1925)
 June 7 – Dan Duryea, American actor (b. 1907)
 June 14
 Karl-Birger Blomdahl, Swedish composer (b. 1916)
 Salvatore Quasimodo, Italian writer, Nobel Prize laureate (b. 1901)
 June 15
 Sam Crawford, American baseball player (b. 1880)
 Wes Montgomery, American jazz guitarist (b. 1923)
 June 17 – José Nasazzi, Uruguayan footballer (b. 1901)
 June 18 – Nikolaus von Falkenhorst, German general and war criminal (b. 1885)
 June 25 – Tony Hancock, English comedian and actor (b. 1924)

July 

 July 1
 Fritz Bauer, German judge and prosecutor (b. 1903)
 Virginia Weidler, American actress (b. 1927)
 July 2
 Zaki al-Arsuzi, Syrian philosopher, philologist, sociologist, and historian (b. 1899)
 Francis Brennan, American cardinal (b. 1894)
 July 9
 Viktor Blinov, Russian ice hockey player (b. 1945)
 Alexander Cadogan, British diplomat (b. 1884)
 July 12 – José Bordas Valdez, 43rd President of the Dominican Republic (b. 1874)
 July 14 – Konstantin Paustovsky, Russian-Soviet writer (b. 1892)
 July 15 – Cai Chusheng, Chinese film director (b. 1906)
 July 18 – Corneille Heymans, Belgian physiologist, Nobel Prize laureate (b. 1892)
 July 20 – Joseph Keilberth, German conductor (b. 1908)
 July 21 – Ruth St. Denis, American dancer (b. 1879)
 July 22 – Giovannino Guareschi, Italian journalist (b. 1908)
 July 23
 Luigi Cevenini, Italian footballer and coach (b. 1895)
 Sir Henry Dale, English pharmacologist and physiologist (b. 1875)
 July 27 – Lilian Harvey, Anglo-German actress and singer (b. 1906)
 July 28
 Otto Hahn, German chemist, discoverer of nuclear fission, Nobel Prize laureate (b. 1879)
 Ángel Herrera Oria, Spanish journalist, politician, cardinal and servant of God (b. 1886)

August 

 August 3 – Konstantin Rokossovsky, Soviet officer, Marshal of the Soviet Union (b. 1896)
 August 5 – Luther Perkins, American guitarist (b. 1928)
 August 19 – George Gamow, Soviet-American theoretical physicist and cosmologist (b. 1904)
 August 25 – Stan McCabe, Australian cricketer (b. 1910)
 August 26 – Kay Francis, American actress (b. 1905)
 August 27
 Robert Z. Leonard, American film director (b. 1889)
 Princess Marina of Greece and Denmark (b. 1906)
 August 29 – Ulysses S. Grant III, American soldier and planner (b. 1881)
 August 30 – William Talman, American actor (b. 1915)
 August 31 – Dennis O'Keefe, American actor (b. 1908)

September 

 September 3 – Juan José Castro, Argentine composer and conductor (b. 1895)
 September 7 – Lucio Fontana, Italian painter and sculptor (b. 1899)
 September 13 – Frank Barson, English footballer (b. 1891)
 September 17 – Armand Blanchonnet, French Olympic cyclist (b. 1903)
 September 18
 Franchot Tone, American actor (b. 1905)
 Francis McDonald, American actor (b. 1891)
 September 19
 Chester Carlson, American physicist, and inventor (b. 1906)
 Red Foley, American singer (b. 1910)
 September 23 – Padre Pio, Italian Roman Catholic priest and saint (b. 1887)
 September 24 – Virginia Valli, American actress (b. 1898)
 September 28 – Sir Norman Brookes, Australian tennis champion (b. 1877)

October 

 October 1 – Romano Guardini, Italian-German Catholic priest and theologian (b. 1885)
 October 2 – Marcel Duchamp, French artist (b. 1887)
 October 4
 Francis Biddle, American politician (b. 1886)
 Hitoshi Imamura, Japanese general (b. 1886)
 October 13
 Manuel Bandeira, Brazilian poet, literary critic, and translator (b. 1886)
 Bea Benaderet, American actress (b. 1906)
 John L. Hines, American general, Chief of Staff of the U.S. Army (b. 1868)
 October 15
 Franz Beyer, German general (b. 1892)
 Herbert Copeland, American biologist (b. 1902)
 October 18 – Lee Tracy, American actor (b. 1898)
 October 26 – Sergei Bernstein, Russian and Soviet mathematician (b. 1880)
 October 27 – Lise Meitner, German-Austrian physicist, discoverer of nuclear fission (b. 1878)
 October 28 – Hans Cramer, German general (b. 1896)
 October 30
 Rose Wilder Lane, American author (b. 1886)
 Ramon Novarro, Mexican-born American actor (b. 1899)
 Conrad Richter, American writer (b. 1890)

November 

 November 1 – Georgios Papandreou, 3-Time Prime Minister of Greece (b. 1888)
 November 6 – Charles Munch, French conductor (b. 1891)
 November 7 – Alexander Gelfond, Soviet mathematician (b. 1906)
 November 8 – Wendell Corey, American actor (b. 1914)
 November 9
 Jan Johansson, Swedish jazz pianist (b. 1931)
 Gerald Mohr, American actor (b. 1914)
 November 11 – Jeanne Demessieux, French composer (b. 1921)
 November 14 – Ramón Menéndez Pidal, Spanish philologist and historian (b. 1869)
 November 15 – Charles Bacon, American athlete (b. 1885)
 November 16
 Augustin Bea, German cardinal (b. 1881)
 Carl Bertilsson, Swedish gymnast (b. 1889)
 November 17 – Mervyn Peake, English writer, artist, poet, and illustrator (b. 1911)
 November 18 – Walter Wanger, American film producer (b. 1894)
 November 20 – Helen Gardner, American actress (b. 1884)
 November 25 – Upton Sinclair, American writer (b. 1878)
 November 26 – Arnold Zweig, German writer, pacifist and socialist (b. 1887)
 November 28 – Enid Blyton, English writer (b. 1897)
 November 30 – Charles Henry Bartlett, British cyclist (b. 1885)

December 

 December 1
 Hugo Haas, Czech actor, director and writer (b. 1901)
 Darío Moreno, Turkish-Jewish polyglot singer, composer, lyricist, and guitarist (b. 1921)
 December 4 – Archie Mayo, American actor and director (b. 1891)
 December 5 – Fred Clark, American actor (b. 1914)
 December 9 – Enoch L. Johnson, American political boss and racketeer (b. 1883)
 December 10
 Karl Barth, German Protestant theologian (b. 1886)
 Thomas Merton, American author (b. 1915)
 December 12
 Tim Ahearne, Irish athlete (b. 1885)
 Tallulah Bankhead, American actress (b. 1902)
 December 14 – Dorothy Payne Whitney, American-born philanthropist, social activist (b. 1887)
 December 18 – Giovanni Messe, Italian field marshal and politician (b. 1883)
 December 19 – Norman Thomas, American socialist (b. 1884)
 December 20
 Max Brod, Czech-born Israeli composer, writer and biographer (b. 1884)
 John Steinbeck, American writer, Nobel Prize laureate (b. 1902)
 December 21 – Vittorio Pozzo, Italian football player and manager (b. 1886)
 December 30
 Trygve Lie, Norwegian politician, 1st Secretary General of the United Nations (b. 1896)
 Kirill Meretskov, Soviet military officer, Marshal of the Soviet Union (b. 1897)
 December 31 – George Lewis, American musician (b. 1900)

Date unknown 
 Sami as-Solh, 5-Time Prime Minister of Lebanon (b. 1887)

Nobel Prizes 

 Physics – Luis Walter Alvarez
 Chemistry – Lars Onsager
 Physiology or Medicine – Robert W. Holley, Har Gobind Khorana, Marshall W. Nirenberg
 Literature – Yasunari Kawabata
 Peace – René Cassin

References

Further reading 
 Sherman, Daniel J. et al. eds. The Long 1968: Revisions and New Perspectives (Indiana University Press; 2013) 382 pages; essays by scholars on the cultural and political impact of 1968 in France, Mexico, Northern Ireland, the United States, etc.
 Kurlansky, Mark. (2004). 1968: The Year that Rocked the World. London: Jonathan Cape. 
 NPR "Echoes of 1968" report series.
 1968 – The Year in Sound An Audiofile produced by Lou Zambrana of WCBS Newsradio 880 (WCBS-AM New York) Part of WCBS 880's celebration of 40 years of newsradio.
 Time, 40th Anniversary Special (2008). "1968: The Year That Changed the World."
 Newsweek. "1968: The Year That Made Us Who We Are." November 19, 2007.
 1968: The Year That Shaped a Generation, time.com, January 11, 1988.
 Magnum Photos, Historic photos from 1968 
 BBC Radio 4 – 1968 Myth or Reality? – six months of 'news on this day' programmes and documentaries
 Interactive 1968 Timeline 
 Reflections on 1968 Read people's memories of the year 1968. Minnesota Historical Society

External links 
 

 
Leap years in the Gregorian calendar